Hamed Pakdel (Persian: حامد پاکدل; born 31 October 1991) is an Iranian footballer. His post is forward and he plays for Tractor from Persian gulf pro league.

Club career

Aluminium Arak
He had a successful era in Aluminium Arak F.C. and was one of the key players of the team. His good performance in the Iranian League attracted the attention of many teams.

Persepolis
On 29 August 2021, Pakdel signed a two-year contract with Persian Gulf Pro League champions Persepolis.

Career statistics

Honours

Aluminium Arak 
Azadegan League: Runner-up (1): 2019–20

Persepolis 
Iranian Super Cup: Runner-up (1): 2021

References

External links 

 Hamed Pakdel at metfootball.com
 Hamed Pakdel at PersianLeague.com
 Hamed Pakdel at Soccerway
 Hamed Pakdel on Instagram
 

1991 births
Living people
Machine Sazi F.C. players
Iranian footballers
People from Dorud
Association football forwards
Pars Jonoubi Jam players
Persepolis F.C. players
Persian Gulf Pro League players